Hamaikabat (H1!) was a Basque nationalist party that existed between 2009 and 2011.

History
It was created by ex-members of Eusko Alkartasuna, being officially registered in May 2009. The main reason of the split was the rejection of the formation of a coalition with the Abertzale left by Eusko Alkartasuna.

H1! disappeared in 2011 after the disastrous electoral results of the local elections of that year.

References 

Left-wing nationalist parties
Political parties in the Basque Country (autonomous community)
Political parties in Navarre
Pro-independence parties
Separatism in Spain
Secessionist organizations in Europe
Social democratic parties
Political parties established in 2009
2009 establishments in Spain